The Gondwana Rainforests of Australia, formerly known as the Central Eastern Rainforest Reserves, are the most extensive area of subtropical rainforest in the world.

Background
The Gondwana Rainforests are so-named because the fossil record indicates that when Gondwana existed it was covered by rainforests containing the same kinds of species that are living today. Not all Gondwanan rainforests in Australia are located in the New South WalesQueensland region; the largest Gondwanan rainforest in Australia is located in Tasmania's Tarkine wilderness. The number of visitors to the Gondwana rainforest reserves in New South Wales and Queensland is about 2 million per year.

The World Heritage status of the region was created and negotiated initially in 1986, with the area extended in 1994, following a nomination which was prepared in 1992 by the Rainforest Conservation Society. The World Heritage listing carries the following inscription:

Conservation value 
The rainforest reserves have an extremely high conservation value, with more than 200 rare or threatened plant and animal species.

Eight separate areas have been identified as having outstanding heritage significance to Australia and are included on the Australian National Heritage List. The altitude of the reserves ranges from sea level to almost .

On 22 December 2000, the High Conservation Value Old Growth forest covering 24 national parks and 19 nature reserves spread across 12 local government areas in the upper north east region of New South Wales were listed on the New South Wales State Heritage Register.

National parks
The Queensland areas include the Main Range, at its most northern point; and extending south, the Lamington, Mount Chinghee, Springbrook  and Mount Barney national parks.

The New South Wales areas include the Barrington Tops, at its most southern point; and extending north, the Dorrigo, Mount Warning, New England, Mebbin, Nightcap, Border Ranges, Oxley Wild Rivers, Washpool, Willi Willi and Werrikimbe national parks.

The most heavily visited parts are Dorrigo National Park and the Natural Bridge section of Springbrook National Park.

Destruction 
The region was historically logged extremely heavily, to such an extent that only 1% of the original range of the Gondwana rainforest remains in Australia. Most of the logged regions have been taken over by eucalyptus forest. 

During the 2019-2020 Australian bushfire season, many regions of the Gondwana rainforest were devastated by bushfires for the first time, with some preliminary reports indicating that up to 53% of the forests may have burned as of January 2020. Among the devastated habitats are several locations that are significant for some critically imperiled species, such as the nightcap oak and the giant barred frog. The presence of these devastating blazes in areas that have never burned before has been linked to the encroachment of the flammable eucalyptus trees into the logged areas adjoining the forests. The general claim of "never burned before" has been challenged by several commentators, based on an article in The Cairns Post on 25 October 1951 that reported a "fire has burnt out about 2000 acres of thick rainforest country" in the Lamington National Park.

Australian National Heritage List sections
The Gondwana Rainforests of Australia are divided into sections for listing on the Australian National Heritage List, from north to south, as below:

See also

 Environment of Australia
 Forests of Australia
 List of World Heritage Sites in Australia
 Mount Banda Banda
 Rainforest Way, a tourist drive featuring the Gondwana rainforests of south-eastern Queensland and north-eastern New South Wales

References

Attribution

External links
 World heritage listing for Gondwana Rainforests of Australia
 Introduction to Gondwana Rainforests of Australia
 

World Heritage Sites in New South Wales
World Heritage Sites in Queensland
Protected areas of Queensland
Protected areas of New South Wales
Tourist attractions in Queensland
Australian National Heritage List

Forests of New South Wales
Forests of Queensland
Great Dividing Range
Protected areas established in 1986
1986 establishments in Australia
New South Wales State Heritage Register
Articles incorporating text from the New South Wales State Heritage Register
Eastern Australian temperate forests